The Industriales de Valencia was a baseball club who played from 1955 through 1968 in the Venezuelan Professional Baseball League. The Industriales joined the league as a replacement for the Santa Marta BBC.

The Industriales were based at Valencia, the capital city of Carabobo state, and played their home games at Estadio Cuatricentenario.

The Valencia club won five season titles, four championships and three sub-championships in its 13-season history, representing Venezuela in the first stage of the Caribbean Series in the 1956 and 1958 tournaments.

Despite their successful performance at the league, the Industriales folded in 1968 due to low attendance numbers. They relocated to Portuguesa state for the 1968–1969 season, and were renamed Llaneros de Acarigua.

Yearly Team Records

All-time roster

Teolindo Acosta
Joe Altobelli
Carlos Ascanio
Ed Bailey
Bob Balcena
Earl Battey
Larry Bearnarth
Babe Birrer
Dámaso Blanco
Gary Blaylock
Ángel Bravo
Tommy Brown
Billy Bryan
Don Bryant
Elio Chacón
Emilio Cueche
Mike Cuellar
George Culver
Gary Dotter
Bobby Durnbaugh
Dick Egan
Turk Farrell
Hank Foiles
Jim Frey
Adrian Garrett
Gustavo Gil
Lenny Green
Joe Hague
Steve Hargan
Ken Harrelson
Jim Hicks
Enrique Izquierdo
Deron Johnson
Lou Johnson
Dick Kenworthy
Ed Kirkpatrick
Julián Ladera
Dick LeMay
Lou Limmer
Jim McGlothlin
Leo Marentette
Héctor Martínez
Lee May
Ed Mickelson
Bob Miller (LHP)
Bob Miller (RHP)
Jesús Mora
Daniel Morejón
Bubba Morton
Mo Mozzali
Ron Mrozinski
Roberto Muñoz
Red Murff
Howie Nunn
Jim Owens
Jim Pearce
Aaron Pointer
Rudy Regalado
Tommie Reynolds
Tony Roig
Chico Ruiz
Ed Sadowski
Ken Sanders
Diego Seguí
R. C. Stevens
Dean Stone
Luis Tiant
Ken Turner
Bruce Von Hoff

Sources
Gutiérrez, Daniel; Alvarez, Efraim; Gutiérrez (h), Daniel (2006). La Enciclopedia del Béisbol en Venezuela. LVBP, Caracas. 
PuraPelota.com – Industriales de Valencia
es.Wikipedia.org – Industriales de Valencia

1955 establishments in Venezuela
Defunct baseball teams in Venezuela
Sport in Carabobo
Baseball teams established in 1955